The Kroger 225 was a NASCAR Craftsman Truck Series held at Louisville Motor Speedway in Louisville, Kentucky. The race was run from 1995 to 1999. Originally a 200-lap race in 1995, the race was increased to 225 laps the next year.

Past winners

Multiple winners (drivers)

Multiple winners (teams)

Manufacturer wins

References

External links
 

Former NASCAR races
NASCAR Truck Series races
NASCAR races at Louisville Motor Speedway
Recurring sporting events established in 1995
1995 establishments in Kentucky
Recurring events disestablished in 1999
1999 disestablishments in Kentucky